Florinas is a comune (municipality) in the Province of Sassari in the Italian region Sardinia, located about  north of Cagliari and about  southeast of Sassari.  

Florinas borders the following municipalities: Banari, Cargeghe, Codrongianos, Ittiri, Ossi, Siligo.

References

External links 

 Official website

Cities and towns in Sardinia